This is a list of state leaders in the 1st century (1–100 AD).

Africa

Africa: East

Ethiopia

Kingdom of Aksum (complete list) –
Zoskales, King (c.100)

Africa: Northeast

Nubia

Kush (complete list) –
Natakamani, King (c.1 BC–c.20 AD)
Amanitore, Queen Co-regent (c.1 BC–?)
Shorkaror, King (c.20–30)
Pisakar, King (mid 1st century)
Amanitaraqide, King (mid 1st century)
Amanitenmemide, King (mid 1st century)
Amanikhatashan, Queen Regent (c.62–c.85)
Teritnide, King (late 1st century)

Africa: Northwest

Morocco

Mauretania (complete list) –
Juba II, client King under Rome (25 BC–23 AD)
Ptolemy, client King under Rome (20–40)

Americas

Americas: Mesoamerica

Maya civilization

Tikal (complete list) –
Yax Ehb Xook, Ajaw (c.90)

Asia

Asia: Central

Mongolia

Xianbei state –
Bianhe, Chieftain (c.49)
Yuchoupen, Chieftain (c.54)

Asia: East
China
Western Han, China (complete list) –
Ping, Emperor (1 BC–5 AD)
Ruzi Ying, Emperor (6–8)

Xin dynasty, China –
Wang Mang, Emperor (9–23)

Eastern Han, China (complete list) –
Gengshi, Emperor (23–25)
Guangwu, Emperor (25–57)
Ming, Emperor (58–75)
Zhang, Emperor (76–88)
He, Emperor (89–105)

Korea
Baekje (complete list) –
Onjo, King (18 BC–28 AD)
Daru, King (28–77)
Giru, King (77–128)

Dongbuyeo (complete list) –
Daeso, King (7 BC–22 AD)

Goguryeo (complete list) –
Yuri, King (19 BC–18 AD)
Daemusin, King (18–44)
Minjung, King (44–48)
Mobon, King (48–53)
Taejodae, King (53–146)

Silla (complete list) –
Hyeokgeose, King (57 BC–4 AD)
Namhae, King (4–24)
Yuri, King (24–57)
Talhae, King (57–80)
Pasa, King (80–112)

Asia: Southeast

Cambodia
Funan –
Soma, Queen (late 1st century)
Hùntián, King (1st/2nd century)

Vietnam
Lĩnh Nam (complete list) –
Trưng Trắc, Queen (40–43); Trưng Nhị, Vicereine (40–43)

Asia: South

India

Indo-Greek Kingdom (complete list) –
Strato II and Strato III, Kings of Eastern Punjab (25 BC–10 AD)

Kushan Empire (complete list) –
Heraios, Clan chief (c.1–c.30)
Kujula Kadphises, Ruler/Emperor (c.30–c.80)
Vima Takto, Ruler/Emperor (c.80–c.95)
Vima Kadphises, Ruler/Emperor (c.95–c.127)

Satavahana dynasty (Purana-based chronology) –
Satakarni III, King (1 BC–1 AD)
Pulumavi I, King (1–36)
Gaura Krishna, King (36–61)
Hāla, King (61–66)
Mandalaka aka Puttalaka or Pulumavi II, King (69–71)
Purindrasena, King (71–76)
Sundara Satakarni, King (76–77)
Chakora Satakarni, King (77–78)
Shivasvati, King (78–106)

Northern Satraps (complete list) –
Rajuvula, Great Satrap (c.10–25)
Bhadayasa, Satrap (early 1st century)
Sodasa, Satrap (early 1st century)

Western Satraps (complete list) –
Abhiraka, Satrap (1st century)

Pakistan

Apracharajas (complete list) –
Vijayamitra, Raja (12 BC–15 AD)
Indravasu, Raja (c.15)
Vispavarma, Raja (c.5/6–20)
Aspavarman, Raja (c.15–45)
Sasan, Raja (c.45–50)

Indo-Parthian Kingdom (complete list) –
Sarpedones, King (c.19–20)
Gondophares, King (c.19–46)
Gadana, King (46–55)
Abdagases I, King (46–60)
Sases, King (mid 1st-century)
Ubouzanes, King (late 1st-century)
Pacores, King (100–135)

Indo-Scythians (complete list) –
Zeionises, Sub-king (c.10 BC–10 AD)
Kharahostes, Sub-king (c.10 BC–10 AD)

Sri Lanka

Anuradhapura Kingdom (complete list) –
Bhatikabhaya Abhaya, King (20 BC–9 AD)
Mahadathika Mahanaga, King (9–21 AD)
Amandagamani Abhaya, King (21–30)
Kanirajanu Tissa, King (30–33)
Chulabhaya, King (33–35)
Sivali, King (35–35)
Ilanaga, King (38–44)
Chandamukha, King (44–52)
Yassalalaka Tissa, King (52–60)
Subharaja, King (60–66)
Vasabha, King (66–110)

Asia: West
Kingdom of Commagene (complete list) –
Antiochus III, King (12 BC–17 AD)
Antiochus IV, King (38–72)

Nabataean kingdom (complete list) –
Aretas IV Philopatris, King (9/8 BC–39/40 AD)
Malichus II, King (39/40–69/70)
Rabbel II Soter, King (70/71–106)

Osroene (complete list) –
Abgar V, King (4 BC–7 AD, 13–50)
Ma'nu IV, King (7–13 AD)
Ma'nu V, King (50–57)
Ma'nu VI, King (57–71)
Abgar VI, King (71–91)
Sanatruk, King (91–109)

Parthian Empire (complete list) –
Musa, Great Queen, Shah (2 BC–4 AD)
Phraates V, Great King, Shah (2 BC–4 AD)
Orodes III, Great King, Shah (4–6)
Vonones I, Great King, Shah (6–12)
Artabanus III, Great King, Shah (10–35)
Tiridates III, Great King, Shah (35–36)
Artabanus III, Great King, Shah (36–38)
Vardanes I, Great King, Shah (40–47)
Gotarzes II, Great King, Shah (40–51)
Vonones II, Great King, Shah (51)
Vologases I, Great King, Shah (51–78)
Vardanes II, Great King, Shah (55–58)
Vologases II, Great King, Shah (77–80)
Pacorus II, Great King, Shah (78–105)
Artabanus IV, Great King, Shah (80–90)

Adiabene (complete list) –
Izates I, client King under Parthia (?–20s AD)
Monobaz I, client King under Parthia (20s–c.36)
Heleni, Queen (c.30–c.58)
Izates bar Monobaz, client King under Parthia (c.36–55/59)
Vologases I, a Parthian rebel opposing Izates II (c.50)
Monobaz II, client King under Parthia (55/59–late 60s/mid-70s)
Meharaspes, client King under Parthia (?–116)

Characene (complete list) –
Attambelos II, client King under Parthia (c.17/16 BC–8/9 AD)
Abinergaos I, client King under Parthia (10/11–22/23)
Orabazes I, client King under Parthia (c.19)
Attambelos III, client King under Parthia (c.37/38–44/45)
Theonesios II, client King under Parthia (c.46/47)
Theonesios III, client King under Parthia (c.52/53)
Attambelos IV, client King under Parthia (54/55–64/65)
Attambelos V, client King under Parthia (64/65–73/74)
Orabazes II, client King under Parthia (c.73–80)
Pakoros II, client King under Parthia (80–101/02)

Elymais (complete list) –
Kamnaskires VII, client King under Parthia (c.28 BC–c.1 AD)
Kamnaskires VIII, client King under Parthia (c.1–c.15 AD)
Kamnaskires IX, client King under Parthia (c.15–c.25)
Orodes I, client King under Parthia (c.25–c.50)
Orodes II, client King under Parthia (c.50–c.70)
Phraates, client King under Parthia (c.70–c.90)
Orodes III, client King under Parthia (c.90–c.100)
Kamnaskires-Orodes, client King under Parthia (c.100–c.120)

Siraces –
Zorsines, King (fl. 41–49)

Roman Asia
Kingdom of Cappadocia (complete list) –
Archelaus, client King under Rome (36 BC–17 AD)

Judea: Herodian dynasty (complete list) –
Herod the Great, client King under Rome (37–4 BC)
Herod Archelaus, client Ethnarch of Judaea under Rome (4 BC–6 AD)
Herod Antipas, client Tetrarch of Galilee under Rome (4 BC–39 AD)
Philip the Tetrarch (or Herod Philip II), client Tetrarch of Iturea, Trachonitis, and Batanaea under Rome (4 BC–34 AD)
Salome I, client Toparch of Jabneh under Rome (4 BC–10 AD)
Herod Agrippa I
client King of Batanaea under Rome (37–41)
client King of Galilee under Rome (40–41)
client King of all Judaea under Rome (41–44)
Herod of Chalcis, client Tetrarch of Chalcis under Rome (41–48)
Herod Agrippa II
client Tetrarch of Chalcis under Rome (48–53)
client Tetrarch of Batanaea under Rome (53–c.92)
Aristobulus of Chalcis
Client king of Armenia Minor under Rome (55–72)
Client tetrarch of Chalcis under Rome (57–92)

Kingdom of Pontus (complete list) –
Pythodorida, client queen under Rome (8 BC–38 AD)
Polemon II, client King under Rome (38–64)

Europe

Europe: Balkans
Bosporan Kingdom (complete list) –
Aspurgus, client king under Rome (8 BC–38 AD)
Polemon II, client king under Rome (38–41)
Rhescuporis I (?), client king under Rome (14–42)
Mithridates III, client king under Rome (42–46)
Cotys I, client king under Rome (46–78)
Incorporated as a part of the Roman Province of Moesia Inferior (63–68)
Rhescuporis II, client king under Rome (78–93)
Sauromates I, client king under Rome (93–123)

Dacia (complete list) –
Comosicus, King (44 BC–28 AD)
Scorilo, King (c.28–68 AD)
Duras, King (68–87)
Decebalus, King (87–106)

Odrysian kingdom of Thrace (complete list) –
Rhoemetalces I, client King of Thrace under Rome (12 BC–12 AD)
Rhescuporis II, client King of western Thrace under Rome (12–19)
Cotys III, client King of eastern Thrace under Rome (12–18)
Rhoemetalces II, client King of Thrace under Rome (19–38)
Rhoemetalces III, client King of Thrace under Rome (38–46)

Europe: British Isles
Brigantes –
Cartimandua, Queen (43–69)
Venutius, King (?–c.52, 69–?)
Vellocatus, King (c.52–c.69)

Cantiaci –
Vodenos, King (?–15)
Eppillus, King (15–?)

Catuvellauni (complete list) –
Tasciovanus, King (c.20 BC–9 AD)
Cunobelinus, King (9–40 AD)
Togodumnus, King (?–43)
Caratacus, King (?–c.50)

Corieltauvi –
Volisios, King (c.45)
Dumnocoveros, Sub-king under Volisios (c.45)
Dubnovellaunus, Sub-king under Volisios (c.45)
Cartivelios, Sub-king under Volisios (c.45)

Iceni –
Can, King (?–25)
Antedios, King (25–40s)
Prasutagus, King (47–60)
Boudica, Queen (60–61)

Regni –
Tiberius Claudius Cogidubnus, King (43–?)

Europe: Central
Marcomanni (complete list) –
Maroboduus, King (9 BC–19 AD)

Europe: Southcentral
Roman Empire: Principate (complete list) –
Augustus/ Octavian, Principate, Emperor (27 BC–14 AD)
Tiberius, Principate, Emperor (14–37)
Gaius "Caligula", Emperor (37–41)
Claudius, Emperor (41–54)
Nero, Emperor (54–68)
Galba, Emperor (68–69)
Otho, Emperor (69)
Vitellius, Emperor (69)
Vespasian, Emperor (69–79)
Titus, Emperor (79–81)
Domitian, Emperor (81–96)
Nerva, Emperor (96–98)
Trajan, Emperor (98–117)
See also: List of Roman consuls

Europe: West
Atrebates (complete list) –
Tincomarus, client King of Thrace under Rome (c.20 BC–7 AD)
Eppillus, client King of Thrace under Rome (8–15)
Verica, client King of Thrace under Rome (15–40)

Batavians –
Gaius Julius Civilis, Leader (?–c.70)

Eurasia: Caucasus
Kingdom of Armenia (complete list) –
Ariobarzanes II, client King under Rome (2 BC–4 AD)
Artavasdes III, client King under Rome (4–6)
Tigranes V, client King under Rome (6–12) 
Interregnum under Parthia
Artaxias III, client King under Rome (18–35)
Arsaces I, client King under Parthia (35)
Orodes, client King under Parthia (35, 37–42)
Mithridates, client King under Rome (35–37, 42–51)
Rhadamistus, client King under Rome (51–53, 53–54)
Tiridates I, client King under Rome (53)

Kingdom of Iberia (Kartli) (complete list) –
Arshak II, King (20 BC–1 AD)
Pharasmanes I, the Great, King (1–58 AD)
Mihrdat I, King (58–106)

See also
List of political entities in the 1st century

References 

Leaders
 
-